Leylah Alliët (born 15 September 1991 in Belgium) is a Belgian beauty pageant titleholder who was crowned as 1st runner up in Miss Belgium 2015 and also crowned Miss World Belgium 2015 and represented her country at the Miss World 2015.

Early life
Alliët was born and raised in the city of Roeselare in the Flemish province of West Flanders. She holds a degree in marketing and real estate and works as marketing manager for Mercedes Benz.

Pageantry

Miss Belgium 2015
Alliët was crowned as Miss World Belgium 2015 in the city of De Panne on January 10, 2015. She was also the 1st runner up in Miss Belgium 2015.

Miss World 2015
Alliët represented her country at Miss World 2015 but did not place.

References

External links
 Main site 

1992 births
Living people
Belgian beauty pageant winners
People from Roeselare
Miss World 2015 delegates